Fritziana tonimi is a species of frogs in the family Hemiphractidae. It is endemic to the Atlantic Forest in the State of Espírito Santo, southeastern Brazil.

Etymology
The specific name tonimi is in honor of herpetofauna conservationist Antônio de Pádua Almeida (Tonim).

Description
This species differs from its relatives in its mucronate snout tip, striped limbs, and open dorsal pouch in females carrying eggs. The species has its unique markings such as a triangle covering the entire dorsum and an inter-orbital triangle with a short “V” shape.

References

caete
Endemic fauna of Brazil
Amphibians of Brazil
Amphibians described in 2016